Brian Aarón Martínez Navarro (born 10 June 1996) is a Mexican professional footballer who plays as a midfielder.

Career

Youth
Martínez joined Monterrey Youth Academy in 2011. He continued through U-15, U-17, and U-20 at Monterrey. Until moving to Querétaro FC starting in Quetéros Youth Academy. Until finally reaching the first team, Jaime Lozano being the coach promoting Martínez to first team.

Querétaro F.C.
Martínez made his professional debut in the Liga MX on 5 August 2017, subbing in during the last 22 minutes of a 3–0 loss against Tigres UANL.

References

External links

Living people
1996 births
People from Ciudad Victoria
Querétaro F.C. footballers
Mexican footballers
Footballers from Tamaulipas
Liga MX players
Association football midfielders